The Kreisliga Bayern (English: District league Bavaria) was the highest association football league in the German Kingdom of Bavaria and, later, the state of Bavaria from 1909 to 1923. The league was disbanded with the introduction of the Bezirksliga Bayern in 1923.

Overview

1907 to 1914
The league was formed in a move to improve the organisation of football in Southern Germany in the early 1900s. Within the structure of the Southern German football championship, four regional leagues were gradually established from 1907, these being:
 Ostkreis-Liga, covering Bavaria
 Nordkreis-Liga, covering Hesse
 Südkreis-Liga, covering Württemberg, Baden and Alsace
 Westkreis-Liga, covering the Palatinate, Lorraine and the southern Rhine Province

In 1909, a first Ostkreis-Liga (English: Eastern District League) was established, consisting of only four clubs and playing a home-and-away season, these clubs being:
 Bayern Munich
 1. FC Nürnberg
 MTV 1879 München
 SpVgg Fürth
The winner of this competition, Bayern Munich, advanced to the Southern German championship, which in turn was a qualifying competition for the German championship. The Bavarian clubs from the Palatinate never played in the same league as the clubs from the "mainland", instead, they were part of the Westkreis-Liga. Previous to the new Ostkreis-Liga, regional competitions with a finals round were played but this was not truly an all-Bavarian competition as only clubs from the major cities took part.

The following season, 1910–11, a proper league with ten clubs was established, the teams again playing a home-and-away season. Parallel, the other three Southern Kreisligas were organised in a similar fashion with the four regional winners playing for the southern title. In the following season, the league was expanded to eleven teams but the modus remained the same.

For the 1912-13 season, the league was reduced to eight teams. It remained unchanged for its last pre-First World War season in 1913-14.

1914 to 1919
The outbreak of war in August 1914 lead to a suspension of all football competitions. Initially it was thought that the war would not last long but when it became evident that this was not so, competitions were restarted with players too young or too old to be drafted to the military. In any case, a 1914-15 championship was not held. A 1915-16 championship was held on regional level with a Bavarian final rather than a league, a system in place for 1916-17  and 1917-18 as well.

1919 to 1923
With the collapse of the German Empire in 1918, no Bavarian championship was played in 1918-19 but football returned to a more organised system in 1919, similar to the one used before the war.

Southern Germany, now without the Alsace region, which had to be returned to France, was sub-divided into ten Kreisligas, these being:
 Kreisliga Hessen      
 Kreisliga Nordbayern  
 Kreisliga Nordmain    
 Kreisliga Odenwald    
 Kreisliga Pfalz       
 Kreisliga Saar        
 Kreisliga Südbayern   
 Kreisliga Südmain     
 Kreisliga Südwest     
 Kreisliga Württemberg

Bavaria was sub-divided into two Kreisligas, north and south, with ten clubs each. Both league winners advanced to the Southern championship. This system applied for the 1919-20 and 1920-21 season.

In 1921-22, the two regional divisions were in turn split into two groups of eight, increasing the number of tier-one clubs in Bavaria to 32. The four league winners then played a semi-final and final to determine the Bavarian champion. This "watering down" of Bavarian football lasted for only one season, in 1922-23, the number of top clubs was halved and the league returned to a northern and southern division, now with eight clubs each. The two league winners played a Bavarian final once more.

In 1923, a league reform which was decided upon in Darmstadt, Hesse, established the Southern German Bezirksligas which were to replace the Kreisligas. The best four teams each from the north and south of Bavaria were admitted to the new Bezirksliga Bayern.

National success

Southern German championship
Qualified teams and their success:
 1910:
 Bayern Munich, Runners-up
 1911:
 Bayern Munich, Runners-up
 1912:
 SpVgg Fürth, 3rd place
 1913:
 SpVgg Fürth, 4th place
 1914:
 SpVgg Fürth, Southern German champions
 1916:
 1. FC Nürnberg, Southern German champions
 1917:
 SpVgg Fürth, Runners-up
 1918:
 1. FC Nürnberg, Southern German champions
 1920:
 1. FC Nürnberg, Southern German champions
 1921:
 1. FC Nürnberg, Southern German champions
 1922:
 Wacker München, Southern German champions
 1923:
 SpVgg Fürth, Southern German champions

German championship
 1914:
 SpVgg Fürth, German champions
 1920:
 1. FC Nürnberg, German champions
 1921:
 1. FC Nürnberg, German champions
 1922:
 Wacker München, Semi-finals
 1. FC Nürnberg, Runners-up
 1923:
 SpVgg Fürth, Semi-finals

Winners and runners-up of the Kreisliga Bayern

 Bold denotes Bavarian champion (when determined).

Placings in the Kreisliga Bayern 1909-23

Ostkreis-Liga 1909-14

Kreisliga Nordbayern 1919-1923

Kreisliga Südbayern 1919-1923

References

Sources
 Fussball-Jahrbuch Deutschland  (8 vol.), Tables and results of the German tier-one leagues 1919-33, publisher: DSFS
 Kicker Almanach,  The yearbook on German football from Bundesliga to Oberliga, since 1937, published by the Kicker Sports Magazine
 Süddeutschlands Fussballgeschichte in Tabellenform 1897-1988  History of Southern German football in tables, publisher & author: Ludolf Hyll

External links
 The Gauligas  Das Deutsche Fussball Archiv 
 German league tables 1892-1933  Hirschi's Fussball seiten
 Germany - Championships 1902-1945 at RSSSF.com

1
1909 establishments in Germany
1923 disestablishments in Germany
Southern German football championship
Sports leagues established in 1909
Ger